Lee Stroyer was a British petrol engine manufacturing company and a producer of a limited number of cars.

Founded in East Street, Coventry in 1903 by H. Pelham Lee in partnership with a Dane called Jens Stroyer.

Stroyer left the company in 1905 and Lee relocated to Paynes Lane, and at the same time renamed the company to Coventry Simplex.

Coventry Simplex went on to become Coventry Climax Engines, one of the most successful Formula One racing engine providers of all time.

See also 
 List of car manufacturers of the United Kingdom

References

Defunct motor vehicle manufacturers of England
Coventry motor companies